Lydia (formerly Mount Elon) is an unincorporated community and census-designated place (CDP) in Darlington County, South Carolina, United States. As of the 2010 census, the population of the CDP was 642. It is the location of Lydia Plantation, which is listed on the U.S. National Register of Historic Places.

Lydia is in western Darlington County, just east of the Lee County line. U.S. Route 15 passes through the community, leading northeast  to Hartsville and southwest  to Bishopville. South Carolina Highway 34 leads east  to Darlington, the county seat.

Geography

Demographics

References

Census-designated places in Darlington County, South Carolina
Census-designated places in South Carolina
Unincorporated communities in South Carolina
Unincorporated communities in Darlington County, South Carolina